KROI (92.1 FM) is a radio station serving the Greater Houston market. Licensed to Seabrook, Texas and owned by Urban One, the station broadcasts an urban gospel format. The station's studios are located in Greenway Plaza and the transmitter is based near Rosharon in unincorporated Brazoria County. It is one of three Radio One-owned stations serving Houston, alongside KBXX and KMJQ.

The station began as a Top 40 station upon its launch on 1983, but later shifted to classical and adult contemporary genres before its acquisition by Radio One, after which it became an urban gospel station. In October 2011, KROI flipped to an all-news format; however, by October 2014, plagued by poor ratings and large financial losses, Radio One flipped KROI to Boom 92—a format focusing on classic hip-hop music. That format also proved to be unsuccessful in the long run, which resulted in another format change back to Top 40 in January 2017. In May 2021, the urban gospel programming (which had been broadcasting on KMJQ-HD2 since 2011) returned to KROI.

History

Early years
The very first radio station in the Houston area on the 92.1 frequency was KREL-FM, sister station of KREL AM1360 in Baytown.  KREL-FM signed on in April 1949, and simulcast its sister station for its entire existence.  With FM radio failing to grow in popularity in the early 50s, KREL-FM was taken off the air in November 1953.  The 92.1 frequency would remain unoccupied for the next thirty years.

The current 92.1 FM frequency signed on the air in September 1983 with a CHR format as KZRQ "Z92". The station, which was only a 1,400-watt at 300-foot Class A, took heavy shots against its CHR neighbor on the dial, KKBQ-FM "93FM" (which is a 100,000-watt Class C at 2,000 feet) and even had a song parody of then hit, Ray Parker Jr's "Ghostbusters" called "Zoobusters" that poked fun of KKBQ-FM's Q-Zoo morning show. The station also claimed to be the first station to play CDs and the world's first all-digital station.

By the fall of 1984, KZRQ was gone, as the station flipped to a beautiful music format with the KYND callsign (ironically, KKBQ-FM's previous incarnation). On April 2, 1986, KYND flipped to classical music, first as KLEF, and then later KRTS. The change occurred to fill the void when KLEF (94.5 FM) flipped from classical to adult contemporary as KJYY. Due to the station's transmitter being located further away from Houston, the station simulcasted on KRTK for a time. KRTS finally got upgrades in the 1980s to a C2 (500 feet and 50,000 watts) at the intersection of US 59 and Texas 288 and then finally as a Class C1 (100,000 watts at 1,000 feet) in the 1990s. It currently is a C1 license (though at lower ERP) on the 2,000-foot Liverpool tower, close to KGLK's tower.

Radio One purchased KRTS in September 2004, changed its calls to KROI, and flipped the station, first to a two-week long Hot AC format as simply "92.1 KROI" on September 15, and then to Regional Mexican as "La Mera Mera" on September 29.  When that was unsuccessful, its owners, which mainly specialize in Urban radio formatted station ownership (with a majority African-American listener base), flipped it one more time to an urban gospel format branded as "Praise 92.1" at 6:45 p.m. on July 17, 2006. The first song on "Praise" was Why We Sing by Kirk Franklin & The Family. KROI was the flagship of the nationally syndicated Yolanda Adams Morning Show, which debuted March 2007. Outside of that, it was mainly jockless throughout the day except for several specialized programs on the weekends.

News 92: filling a void in Houston radio
On October 28, 2011, Radio One announced that KROI would flip to an all-news format, starting November 17. This is the first time Radio One has programmed an all-news station geared towards a mainstream audience. Houston, the 6th largest radio market in the United States, according to Arbitron, has been underserved in regards to radio news, as KTRH and KPRC, well known for news coverage in past decades, have become predominantly talk radio oriented in recent years. The Praise 92 gospel format, as well as the station's status as the flagship of the Yolanda Adams Morning Show, moved over to the HD2 subchannel of KMJQ and to its online website.

On November 18, 2011, at 9 a.m., following the Yolanda Adams Morning Show (and after playing "Clean Inside" by Hezekiah Walker), KROI began stunting with construction sounds in preparation of its switch to all-news, with slogans such as "100% News, 0% Spin", "Reporting Houston 24/7", "Just give us 20 minutes each day for the next 20 days". There were also liners promoting that News 92 would launch soon during the stunt. The new format officially launched on November 21, 2011 at 5 AM. On-air talent included former radio and TV personalities from KTRH, KSEV, KPRC-TV, KLOL, KRBE, KIAH and KRIV, most already fairly well-known to the Houston audience (additionally, afternoon traffic reporter Robert Washington, who served in a similar role some years back for KTRH, was a DJ under the gospel music format). The new format operated as an affiliate of ABC News Radio (which was picked up by KTRH in 2016) and featured ABC News reports at the top and bottom of each hour. It also aired syndicated programs, such as The Jim Bohannon Show on weeknights and The John Batchelor Show on weekend evenings; weather and traffic updates are delivered "on the 9s". On Sundays, simulcasts of ABC's This Week with George Stephanopoulos and NBC's Meet the Press were featured.

During the three years of the news format, the station had low ratings; in September 2014, KROI was ranked in 26th place on Nielsen Audio ratings, with an overall audience share of only 0.9.

Boom 92
On October 8, 2014, at 9 a.m., KROI ended its all-news format and laid off 47 employees; Radio One management cited poor ratings performance and "significant financial losses over the past three years despite the substantial financial and human resources invested" as reasoning for the decision. Following the sign-off of News 92, the station returned to a music-based format, stunting as "B92" by exclusively playing music by Houston native Beyoncé.

On October 13, 2014, at 5 p.m., KROI flipped to a classic hip hop format branded as Boom 92; the launch symbolically featured "Mind Playing Tricks on Me", a song by the Houston-based Geto Boys, as its first song. The format focused primarily on hip-hop acts from the 1980s and the 1990s, and was aimed towards listeners between the ages of 25 and 44, complementing its sister stations KMJQ and KBXX. Doug Abernethy, general manager of Radio One's Houston stations, described the format as a parallel to the classic rock and classic country formats, while Radio One considered the station to be the first major market station of its kind in the United States.

KROI became the first of many stations to adopt the format in the following months. KROI's ratings also saw a significant improvement over that of its news format, becoming the 14th highest-rated radio station in Houston with an audience share of 3.2 as of November 2014, however, by the following Spring, it would once again suffer low ratings, holding an audience share of 1.8 as of April 2015, and eventually only 1.0 as of June 2016. While the station did improve to a 1.4 by the December books, it was too little, too late for "Boom."

92.1 Radio Now
On January 4, 2017, Radio One registered several domain names associated with "Now" for the station, which led to speculation that KROI would undergo a format change for the third time in five years. Registration of the website "radionowhouston.com" occurred the previous day on January 3, and coincided directly with the same registrar as "boom92houston.com", further fueling the rumors of an imminent format change.

On January 5, 2017, at 5 p.m., after playing "Da Rockwilder" by Method Man & Redman, KROI flipped to Top 40/CHR as "92.1 Radio Now", capitalizing on the recent dropping of the format by KKHH the week prior, and hoping to pick up listeners spurned by said format change. The first song on "Radio Now" was "This Is What You Came For" by Calvin Harris and Rihanna. With the change, KROI once again became one of only two stations owned by Radio One to not carry an urban-oriented format (the other being similarly-formatted WNOW-FM in Indianapolis) and the second to sport the "Radio Now" moniker. The change also brought the conclusion to the third ever Classic Hip-Hop station in the U.S. (the first two to air the format were then-Phoenix station KNRJ and Los Angeles station KDAY, who continues with the format), and returned the station to the original format it launched with in 1983.

On November 12, 2018, the station added "The Joe & Alex Show" from sister WNOW-FM, as its new morning show. In March 2020, the show was replaced by The Kidd Kraddick Morning Show.

Praise 92.1
On May 17, 2021, KROI flipped back to urban gospel under the former "Praise 92.1" branding.

References

External links

Urban One stations
ROI
Radio stations established in 1983
Gospel radio stations in the United States